

Education 
Gosk graduated high school in 1990 from Phillips Academy. She then began her college career at Middlebury College in Vermont, but decided she wanted to experience college in a large city so she chose to transfer to Georgetown University in Washington D.C. During her time there, Gosk spent a semester abroad in Florence, Italy. After graduating Georgetown in 1994 with a bachelor's degree in economics, she spent time in the Dominican Republic as a Peace Corps volunteer.

Personal life
Gosk is openly lesbian. She and her partner, former Weekend Today news anchor Jenna Wolfe, have two daughters.

See also
 Broadcast journalism
 LGBT culture in New York City
 List of LGBT people from New York City
 Network news programming
 New Yorkers in journalism

References

External links
 NBC's Bio of Gosk

1972 births
Living people
People from Londonderry, New Hampshire
American television journalists
American women television journalists
American lesbian writers
American LGBT journalists
LGBT people from New Hampshire
Georgetown College (Georgetown University) alumni
NBC News people
21st-century American women writers